Molk e Qozat (also Romanized as Molk e Qozāt, Molk e Qoẕāt, Molk e Qozzāt, and Molk-e Qoẕāt; also known as Molk, Molk e Ghozat, Mulk, and Myul’k) is a village in Dizmar-e Markazi Rural District, Kharvana District, Varzaqan County, East Azerbaijan Province, Iran. At the 2006 census, its population was 169, in 42 families.

References 

Towns and villages in Varzaqan County